Chaetocneme denitza, commonly known as the rare red-eye or ornate dusk-flat, is a species of butterfly in the skipper family Hesperiidae. It is endemic to Australia.

References

Tagiadini
Butterflies of Australia
Butterflies described in 1867
Taxa named by William Chapman Hewitson